Asagena meridionalis is a species of cobweb spider in the family Theridiidae. It is found throughout central, south, and east Europe, as well as the Caucasus.

References

Theridiidae
Spiders described in 1894
Spiders of Asia
Spiders of Europe